Aleurothrixus floccosus, the woolly whitefly, is a species of whitefly in the family Aleyrodidae. Probably native to the Neotropics; it is found in the Nearctic, Africa and Europe.

References

Whiteflies
Articles created by Qbugbot
Insects described in 1896